The Col du Pourtalet, El Portalet or Portalet d'Aneu is a mountain pass and border crossing in the Pyrenees, between France and Spain.

The road across the pass is known as the A-136 on the Spanish side, and links to Biescas and Huesca. On the French side the D934 road connects the pass to the towns of Laruns, Oloron-Sainte-Marie and Pau. The pass is kept open in the winter, but in case of heavy snowfall may be closed for a couple of days. Due to the Schengen Agreement the checkpoint is not functional nowadays.

The French side of the pass falls within the commune of Laruns in the département of Pyrénées-Atlantiques, whilst the Spanish side is within the municipality of Sallent de Gállego within the province of Huesca.

See also
 List of highest paved roads in Europe
 List of mountain passes

References

Mountain passes of the Pyrenees
Mountain passes of Nouvelle-Aquitaine
Mountain passes of Aragon
Geography of the Province of Huesca
Landforms of Pyrénées-Atlantiques
Transport in Nouvelle-Aquitaine
Transport in Aragon
France–Spain border crossings